Baltic mythology is the body of mythology of the Baltic people stemming from Baltic paganism and continuing after Christianization and into Baltic folklore.

History
Baltic mythology ultimately stems from Proto-Indo-European mythology. The Baltic region was one of the last regions of Europe to be Christianized, a process that began in the 15th century and continued for at least a century afterward. While no native texts survive detailing the mythology of the Baltic peoples during the pagan period, knowledge of such beliefs may be gained from Roman and German chronicles, from later folklore, from etymology and from the reconstructions of comparative mythology.

While the early chronicles (14th and 15th century) were largely the product of missionaries who sought to eradicate the native paganism of the Baltic peoples, rich material survives into Baltic folklore. This material has been of particular value in Indo-European studies as, like the Baltic languages, it is considered by scholars to be notably conservative, reflecting elements of Proto-Indo-European religion. The Indo-European Divine Twins are particularly well represented as the Dieva dēli (Latvian 'sons of god') and Dievo sūneliai (Lithuanian 'sons of god'). According to folklore, they are the children of Dievas (Lithuanian and Latvian - see Proto-Indo-European *Dyeus). Associated with the brothers and their father are two goddesses; the personified Sun, Saule (Latvian 'sun') and Saules meita (Latvian 'Sun's daughter').

See also
 Latvian mythology
 Lithuanian mythology
 Prussian mythology
 Baltic neopaganism
 Romuva (religion)

Notes

References

 Puhvel, Jaan (1989 [1987]). Comparative Mythology. Johns Hopkins University Press.
 Mallory, J. P. Adams, Douglas Q. (Editors) (1997). Encyclopedia of Indo-European Culture. Taylor & Francis.

Further reading

 Balode-Anelauskaitė, Laimutė. "Baltic names of deities in the hydronyms of Latvia and Lithuania". In: Perspectives of Baltic philology. 1 / ed. by Jowita Niewulis-Grablunas, Justyna Prusinowska, Ewa Stryczyńska-Hodyl. Poznań: Wydawnictwo Rys, 2008. pp. 21-40. .
 Běťáková, Marta Eva; Blažek, Václav. Encyklopedie baltské mytologie. Praha: Libri. 2012. .
 
 
 Calin, Didier. Indo-European Poetics and the Latvian Folk Songs. Riga: 1996. Thesis (expanded version).
 Dini P. U., Mikhailov N. "Materiali preliminari per una bibliografia della Mitologia baltica. In: Res Balticae, Nr. 03, 1997. pp. 165-213.
 Dini P. U., Mikhailov N. "Materiali preliminari per una bibliografia della Mitologia Baltica. II. In: Res Balticae, Nr. 7, 2001. pp. 101–116.
 
 Vėlius, Norbertas. Senovės baltų pasaulėžiūra: struktūros bruožai [The World Outlook of the Ancient Balts]. Vilnius: Mintis, 1983.
 Young, Francis. Pagans in the Early Modern Baltic: Sixteenth-Century Ethnographic Accounts of Baltic Paganism. Arc Humanities Press, 2022. DOI: https://doi.org/10.1515/9781802700213.
 Zaroff, Roman. "Some aspects of pre-Christian Baltic religion". In: New researches on the religion and mythology of the Pagan Slavs. Edited by Patrice Lajoye. Paris: Lingva, 2019. pp. 183–219.
 Lietuvių mitologija. T. 3. Sudarė N. Vėlius ir G. Beresnevičius. Vilnius: Mintis, 2004.

 
Mythology
Indo-European mythology